Aguiar da Beira is a former freguesia ("civil parish") in Aguiar da Beira Municipality, Guarda District, Portugal. It was merged with Coruche in 2013 to form the new freguesia Aguiar da Beira e Coruche. The Pillory of Aguiar da Beira is located in this former freguesia.

Demography

References 

Former parishes of Aguiar da Beira